The 1903 Pittsburgh Pirates season was the 22nd year the Pittsburgh Pirates played in Major League Baseball. The club finished their season as National League champions, beating the second-place New York Giants by  games. They went on to participate in the 1903 World Series, the first to be played between the champions of the National League and American League. The Pirates started off well, winning 3 of the first four games, but the Boston Americans won the last four straight to win the series five games to three. The Pirates set a record of 56 consecutive innings without allowing the opposing team to score a run, a record that still stands today.

Offseason 
 Prior to 1903 season: Jack O'Connor jumped from the Pirates to the New York Highlanders.

Regular season

Season standings

Record vs. opponents

Opening Day lineup

Notable transactions 
 May 28, 1903: Reddy Grey was acquired by the Pirates on loan from the Worcester Riddlers.

Roster

Player stats

Batting

Starters by position 
Note: Pos = Position; G = Games played; AB = At bats; H = Hits; Avg. = Batting average; HR = Home runs; RBI = Runs batted in

Other batters 
Note: G = Games played; AB = At bats; H = Hits; Avg. = Batting average; HR = Home runs; RBI = Runs batted in

Pitching

Starting pitchers 
Note: G = Games pitched; IP = Innings pitched; W = Wins; L = Losses; ERA = Earned run average; SO = Strikeouts

Other pitchers 
Note: G = Games pitched; IP = Innings pitched; W = Wins; L = Losses; ERA = Earned run average; SO = Strikeouts

Relief pitchers 
Note: G = Games pitched; W = Wins; L = Losses; SV = Saves; ERA = Earned run average; SO = Strikeouts

1903 World Series 

Pittsburgh Pirates vs. Boston Americans

Game 1 
October 1, 1903, at Huntington Avenue Grounds in Boston, Massachusetts

The Pirates started Game 1 strong, scoring six runs in the first four innings. They extended their lead to 7–0 on a solo home run by Jimmy Sebring in the 7th, the first home run in World Series history. Boston tried to mount a comeback in the last three innings, but it was too little, too late, as they ended up losing by a score of 7–3 in the first ever World Series game. Both starting pitchers, Deacon Phillippe of the Pirates and Cy Young of Boston, threw complete games, with Phillippe striking out 10 and Young fanning 5, but Young also gave up twice as many hits and allowed 3 earned runs to Phillippe's 2.

Game 2 
October 2, 1903, at Huntington Avenue Grounds in Boston, Massachusetts

After starting out strong in Game 1, the Pirates simply shut down offensively, managing to get a meager 3 hits, all of which were singles. Pirates starter Sam Leever went only one inning and gave up 3 hits and 2 runs before being replaced by Bucky Veil in the second inning due to injury, who finished the game for Pittsburgh. Bill Dinneen struck out 11 and pitched a complete game for the Americans, while Patsy Dougherty hit home runs in the first and sixth innings to produce 2 of the Boston's 3 runs.

Game 3 

October 3, 1903, at Huntington Avenue Grounds in Boston, Massachusetts

Deacon Phillippe, pitching on only one day rest, started Game 3 for the Pirates, and did not let them down as he pitched his second complete-game victory of the series to put the Pirates up two games to one.

Game 4 
October 6, 1903, at Exposition Park in Allegheny, Pennsylvania

After two days of rest, Deacon Phillippe was ready to pitch his second straight game. He threw his third complete-game victory of the series against Bill Dinneen, who was pitching in his second start of the series. However, Phillippe's second straight victory was almost not to be, as the Americans, down 5–1 in the top of the ninth, staged a rally to bring the game within one. The comeback attempt failed, though, as Phillippe managed to put an end to it and give the Pirates a commanding 3–1 series lead.

Game 5 
October 7, 1903, at Exposition Park in Allegheny, Pennsylvania

Game 5 was a pitcher's duel for the first five innings, with Boston's Cy Young and Pittsburgh's Brickyard Kennedy giving up no runs. That changed at the top of the sixth, however, when the Americans scored a then-record 6 runs that inning. Young, on the other hand, managed to keep his shutout intact before finally giving up a pair of runs in the bottom of the eighth. He went the distance and struck out four for his first World Series win.

Game 6 
October 8, 1903, at Exposition Park in Allegheny, Pennsylvania

Game 6 featured a rematch between the starters of Game 2, Bill Dinneen (Boston) and Sam Leever (Pittsburgh). This time, Leever would pitch the entire game, but despite throwing a complete game he was outmatched by Dinneen, who ended up with his second complete-game victory of the series. After losing three of the first four games of the World Series, the underdog Boston Americans had tied the series at three games apiece.

Game 7 
October 10, 1903, at Exposition Park in Allegheny, Pennsylvania

The fourth and final game in Allegheny City saw Deacon Phillippe start his fourth game of the series for Pittsburgh. This time, however, he wouldn't fare as well as he did in his first three starts. Cy Young, pitching in his third start of the series, would face a much more favorable fate, holding the Pirates to only three runs.

Game 8 
October 13, 1903, at Huntington Avenue Grounds in Boston, Massachusetts

The final game of the inaugural World Series started out as an intense pitcher's duel, with no runs being scored until the fourth inning – when a Hobe Ferris single scored two runners. Deacon Phillippe started his fifth and final game of the series, while Bill Dinneen started his fourth game of the series. As he did in Game 2, Dinneen threw a complete game shutout while striking out seven, leading the Boston Americans to victory, while Phillippe, who also threw a respectable game, just couldn't pitch at Dinneen's level due to wearing out his arm in the series (as a result of playing so many games in such a short time span) and gave up three runs in the defeat.  Honus Wagner struck out to end the Series.

Notes

References

External links
 1903 Pittsburgh Pirates team page at Baseball Reference
 1903 Pittsburgh Pirates Page at Baseball Almanac

National League champion seasons
Pittsburgh Pirates seasons
Pittsburgh Pirates season
Pittsburg Pir